Riaz Hussain Khokhar (born 31 December 1942) is a retired Pakistani diplomat who served as the Foreign Secretary of Pakistan from June 2002 to February 2005. Khokhar also served as Pakistan's ambassador to India (1992–1997), the United States (1997–1999) and China (1999–2002) before leading the top post of foreign ministry as Foreign Secretary of Pakistan.

Career
Riaz Khokhar joined the Foreign Service of Pakistan on 10 October 1966.
In September 2003, Riaz Khokhar briefed a group of Kashmiri leaders on the upcoming India-Pakistan talks before he left for New Delhi for talks with India.

In 2004, former president of Pakistan controlled Kashmir, Sardar Muhammad Abdul Qayyum Khan reportedly said, "The Kashmiri leadership supported the composite dialogue between the two countries but noted that the talks should not be held at the expense of Kashmir."

Again in 2004, All Parties Hurriyat Conference of Kashmir also expressed their support to the ongoing dialogue between India and Pakistan. They reportedly said that the talks should continue until the Kashmir dispute is resolved.

On 29 June 2004, Pakistani Foreign Secretary, Riaz Khokhar stated, "In my judgement I found and saw that the Indian side was serious and committed and determined to move forward on the composite dialogue."

References

External links
News related to Riaz Khokhar
Jim Lehrer's of US Public Broadcasting Services interview with Riaz Khokhar

|-

|-

|-

Foreign Secretaries of Pakistan
Ambassadors of Pakistan to the United States
Ambassadors of Pakistan to China
Living people
1942 births
Place of birth missing (living people)
Punjabi people
High Commissioners of Pakistan to India